This is a list of the Australian moth species of the family Lecithoceridae. It also acts as an index to the species articles and forms part of the full List of moths of Australia.

Achoria inopina Meyrick, 1904
Cophomantella lychnocentra (Meyrick, 1904)
Crocanthes acroxantha Lower, 1896
Crocanthes characotis Meyrick, 1916
Crocanthes chordotona Meyrick, 1916
Crocanthes diula Meyrick, 1904
Crocanthes doliopa Meyrick, 1921
Crocanthes epitherma Lower, 1896
Crocanthes glycina Meyrick, 1904
Crocanthes halurga Meyrick, 1904
Crocanthes micradelpha (Lower, 1897)
Crocanthes pancala (Turner, 1919)
Crocanthes perigrapta Meyrick, 1904
Crocanthes prasinopis Meyrick, 1886
Crocanthes sidonia Meyrick, 1910
Crocanthes thermobapta Lower, 1920
Crocanthes thiomorpha Turner, 1933
Crocanthes trizona Lower, 1916
Crocanthes venustula Turner, 1933
Crocanthes zonias Meyrick, 1904
Crocanthes zonodesma Lower, 1900
Lecithocera absumptella (Walker, 1864)
Lecithocera alampes Turner, 1919
Lecithocera anympha Meyrick, 1916
Lecithocera chamela Turner, 1919
Lecithocera concinna (Turner, 1919)
Lecithocera cyamitis (Meyrick, 1904)
Lecithocera eumenopis Meyrick, 1914
Lecithocera imprudens Meyrick, 1914
Lecithocera isophanes (Turner, 1919)
Lecithocera linocoma Meyrick, 1916
Lecithocera micromela (Lower, 1897)
Lecithocera noseropa (Turner, 1919)
Lecithocera poliocoma Meyrick, 1916
Lecithocera sobria (Meyrick, 1904)
Lecithocera terrena (Turner, 1919)
Lecithocera terrigena (Meyrick, 1904)
Oecia oecophila (Staudinger, 1876)
Protolychnis trigonias (Meyrick, 1904)
Sarisophora brachymita (Turner, 1919)
Sarisophora chlaenota Meyrick, 1904
Sarisophora cyclonitis (Meyrick, 1904)
Sarisophora dispila (Turner, 1919)
Sarisophora leptoglypta Meyrick, 1904
Sarisophora leucoscia Turner, 1919
Sarisophora nyctiphylax Turner, 1919
Sarisophora pycnospila Turner, 1919
Sarisophora tenella Turner, 1919
Sisyrodonta ochrosidera Meyrick, 1922

External links 
Lecithoceridae at Australian Faunal Directory

Australia
Lecithoceridae